Ubiquilin-2 is a protein that in humans is encoded by the UBQLN2 gene.

Function 

This gene encodes a ubiquitin-like protein (ubiquilin) that shares high degree of similarity with related products in yeast, rat and frog. Ubiquilins contain a N-terminal ubiquitin-like domain and a C-terminal ubiquitin-associated domain. They physically associate with both proteasomes and ubiquitin ligases, and are thus thought to functionally link the ubiquitination machinery to the proteasome to effect in vivo protein degradation. This ubiquilin has also been shown to bind the ATPase domain of the Hsp70-like Stch protein.

Similarity to other proteins

Human UBQLN2 shares a high degree of similarity with related ubiquilins including UBQLN1 and UBQLN4.

Clinical significance 

In a small proportion of familial amyotrophic lateral sclerosis (fALS), the UBQLN2 gene is mutated, causing formation of a non-functional Ubiquilin 2 enzyme. This non-functioning enzyme leads to the accumulation of ubiquinated proteins in the lower motor neurons and upper corticospinal motor neurons, due to the fact that ubiquilin 2 normally degrades these ubiquinated proteins, but cannot if the ALS mutation is present. The same accumulations occur in patients without UBQLN2 mutations, but with mutations in other genes, including TDP-43 and C9ORF72.

Interactions
UBQLN2 has been shown to interact with HERPUD1 and UBE3A.

References

Further reading